is the 29th single by Japanese singer/songwriter Chisato Moritaka. The lyrics were written by Moritaka and the music was composed by Hiromasa Ijichi. The single was released by One Up Music on June 10, 1996. The song was used as the opening and ending theme of Fuji TV's news magazine program Mezamashi TV from April 1, 1996 to March 28, 1997. The single was re-released by zetima on April 16, 2008 with a bonus DVD containing the music video to coincide with the song's use by Kao Corporation for a Blaune hair coloring commercial featuring Moritaka.

Background 
Moritaka's 10th studio album Taiyo contains the song . This is because Fuji TV requested for the song to be used on their news magazine program Mezamashi TV.

Moritaka performed the song on the 47th Kōhaku Uta Gassen.

Chart performance 
"La La Sunshine" peaked at No. 5 on Oricon's singles chart and sold 179,000 copies. It was also certified Gold by the RIAJ.

Other versions 
Moritaka re-recorded the song and uploaded the video on her YouTube channel on August 20, 2012. This version is also included in Moritaka's 2013 self-covers DVD album Love Vol. 2.

The song was remixed by tofubeats in the 2014 collaboration album Chisato Moritaka with tofubeats: Moritaka Tofu.

Track listing 
All lyrics are written by Chisato Moritaka; all music is arranged by Yuichi Takahashi.

Personnel 
 Chisato Moritaka – vocals, drums
 Yuichi Takahashi – guitar, keyboard
 Shin Hashimoto – piano
 Yukio Seto – guitar, bass

Chart positions

Certification

References

External links 
 
 
 

1996 singles
1996 songs
Japanese-language songs
Chisato Moritaka songs
Songs with lyrics by Chisato Moritaka
Songs with music by Hiromasa Ijichi
One Up Music singles